Hugh Ramapolo Masekela (4 April 1939 – 23 January 2018) was a South African trumpeter, flugelhornist, cornetist, singer and composer who was described as "the father of South African jazz". Masekela was known for his jazz compositions and for writing well-known anti-apartheid songs such as "Soweto Blues" and "Bring Him Back Home". He also had a number-one US pop hit in 1968 with his version of "Grazing in the Grass".

Early life
Hugh Ramapolo Masekela was born in the township of KwaGuqa in Witbank (now called Emalahleni), South Africa, to Thomas Selena Masekela, who was a health inspector and sculptor and his wife, Pauline Bowers Masekela, a social worker. His younger sister Barbara Masekela is a poet, educator and ANC activist. As a child, he began singing and playing piano and was largely raised by his grandmother, who ran an illegal bar for miners. At the age of 14, after seeing the 1950 film Young Man with a Horn (in which Kirk Douglas plays a character modelled on American jazz cornetist Bix Beiderbecke), Masekela took up playing the trumpet. His first trumpet was bought for him from a local music store by Archbishop Trevor Huddleston, the anti-apartheid chaplain at St. Peter's Secondary School now known as St. Martin's School (Rosettenville).

Huddleston asked the leader of the then Johannesburg "Native" Municipal Brass Band, Uncle Sauda, to teach Masekela the rudiments of trumpet playing. Masekela quickly mastered the instrument. Soon, some of his schoolmates also became interested in playing instruments, leading to the formation of the Huddleston Jazz Band, South Africa's first youth orchestra. When Louis Armstrong heard of this band from his friend Huddleston he sent one of his own trumpets as a gift for Hugh. By 1956, after leading other ensembles, Masekela joined Alfred Herbert's African Jazz Revue.

From 1954, Masekela played music that closely reflected his life experience. The agony, conflict, and exploitation faced by South Africa during the 1950s and 1960s inspired and influenced him to make music and also spread political change.  He was an artist who in his music vividly portrayed the struggles and sorrows, as well as the joys and passions of his country. His music protested about apartheid, slavery, government; the hardships individuals were living. Masekela reached a large population that also felt oppressed due to the country's situation.

Following a Manhattan Brothers tour of South Africa in 1958, Masekela wound up in the orchestra of the musical King Kong, written by Todd Matshikiza. King Kong was South Africa's first blockbuster theatrical success, touring the country for a sold-out year with Miriam Makeba and the Manhattan Brothers' Nathan Mdledle in the lead. The musical later went to London's West End for two years.

Career

At the end of 1959, Dollar Brand (later known as Abdullah Ibrahim), Kippie Moeketsi, Makhaya Ntshoko, Jonas Gwangwa, Johnny Gertze and Hugh formed the Jazz Epistles, the first African jazz group to record an LP.  They performed to record-breaking audiences in Johannesburg and Cape Town through late 1959 to early 1960.

Following the 21 March 1960 Sharpeville massacre—where 69 protestors were shot dead in Sharpeville, and the South African government banned gatherings of ten or more people—and the increased brutality of the Apartheid state, Masekela left the country. He was helped by Trevor Huddleston and international friends such as Yehudi Menuhin and John Dankworth, who got him admitted into London's Guildhall School of Music in 1960. During that period, Masekela visited the United States, where he was befriended by Harry Belafonte. After securing a scholarship back in London, Masekela moved to the United States to attend the Manhattan School of Music in New York, where he studied classical trumpet from 1960 to 1964. In 1964, Miriam Makeba and Masekela were married, divorcing two years later.

He had hits in the US with the pop jazz tunes "Up, Up and Away" (1967) and the number-one smash "Grazing in the Grass" (1968), which sold four million copies. He also appeared at the Monterey Pop Festival in 1967, and was subsequently featured in the film Monterey Pop by D. A. Pennebaker and mentioned in the song Monterey by Eric Burdon & the Animals. In 1974, Masekela and friend Stewart Levine organised the Zaire 74 music festival in Kinshasa set around the Rumble in the Jungle boxing match.

He played primarily in jazz ensembles, with guest appearances on recordings by the Byrds ("So You Want to Be a Rock 'n' Roll Star" and "Lady Friend") and Paul Simon ("Further to Fly"). In 1984, Masekela released the album Techno Bush; from that album, a single entitled "Don't Go Lose It Baby" peaked at number two for two weeks on the dance charts. In 1987, he had a hit single with "Bring Him Back Home". The song became enormously popular, and turned into an unofficial anthem of the anti-apartheid movement and an anthem for the movement to free Nelson Mandela.

A renewed interest in his African roots led Masekela to collaborate with West and Central African musicians, and finally to reconnect with Southern African players when he set up with the help of Jive Records a mobile studio in Botswana, just over the South African border, from 1980 to 1984. Here he re-absorbed and re-used mbaqanga strains, a style he continued to use following his return to South Africa in the early 1990s.

In 1985 Masekela founded the Botswana International School of Music (BISM), which held its first workshop in Gaborone in that year. The event, still in existence, continues as the annual Botswana Music Camp, giving local musicians of all ages and from all backgrounds the opportunity to play and perform together. Masekela taught the jazz course at the first workshop, and performed at the final concert.

Also in the 1980s, Masekela toured with Paul Simon in support of Simon's album Graceland, which featured other South African artists such as Ladysmith Black Mambazo, Miriam Makeba, Ray Phiri, and other elements of the band Kalahari, which was co-founded by guitarist Banjo Mosele and which backed Masekela in the 1980s. As well as recording with Kalahari, he also collaborated in the musical development for the Broadway play Sarafina!, which premiered in 1988.

In 2003, he was featured in the documentary film Amandla!: A Revolution in Four-Part Harmony.  In 2004, he released his autobiography, Still Grazing: The Musical Journey of Hugh Masekela, co-authored with journalist D. Michael Cheers, which detailed Masekela's struggles against apartheid in his homeland, as well as his personal struggles with alcoholism from the late 1970s to the 1990s. In this period, he migrated, in his personal recording career, to mbaqanga, jazz/funk, and the blending of South African sounds, through two albums he recorded with Herb Alpert, and solo recordings, Techno-Bush (recorded in his studio in Botswana), Tomorrow (featuring the anthem "Bring Him Back Home"), Uptownship (a lush-sounding ode to American R&B), Beatin' Aroun de Bush, Sixty, Time, and Revival. His song "Soweto Blues", sung by his former wife, Miriam Makeba, is a blues/jazz piece that mourns the carnage of the Soweto riots in 1976. He also provided interpretations of songs composed by Jorge Ben, Antônio Carlos Jobim, Caiphus Semenya, Jonas Gwangwa, Dorothy Masuka, and Fela Kuti.

In 2006 Masekela was described by Michael A. Gomez, professor of history and Middle Eastern and Islamic studies at New York University as "the father of African jazz."

In 2009, Masekela released the album Phola (meaning "to get well, to heal"), his second recording for 4 Quarters Entertainment/Times Square Records. It includes some songs he wrote in the 1980s but never completed, as well as a reinterpretation of "The Joke of Life (Brinca de Vivre)", which he recorded in the mid-1980s. From October 2007, he was a board member of the Woyome Foundation for Africa.

In 2010, Masekela was featured, with his son Selema Masekela, in a series of videos on ESPN. The series, called Umlando – Through My Father's Eyes, was aired in 10 parts during ESPN's coverage of the FIFA World Cup in South Africa. The series focused on Hugh's and Selema's travels through South Africa. Hugh brought his son to the places he grew up. It was Selema's first trip to his father's homeland.

On 3 December 2013, Masekela guested with the Dave Matthews Band in Johannesburg, South Africa. He joined Rashawn Ross on trumpet for "Proudest Monkey" and "Grazing in the Grass".

In 2016, at Emperors Palace, Johannesburg, Masekela and Abdullah Ibrahim performed together for the first time in 60 years, reuniting the Jazz Epistles in commemoration of the 40th anniversary of the historic 16 June 1976 youth demonstrations.

Social initiatives
Masekela was involved in several social initiatives, and served as a director on the board of the Lunchbox Fund, a non-profit organization that provides a daily meal to students of township schools in Soweto.

Personal life and death
From 1964 to 1966 Masekela was married to singer and activist Miriam Makeba. He had subsequent marriages to Chris Calloway (daughter of Cab Calloway), Jabu Mbatha, and Elinam Cofie. During the last few years of his life, he lived with the dancer Nomsa Manaka. He was the father of American television host Sal Masekela. Poet, educator, and activist Barbara Masekela is his younger sister. 

Masekela died in Johannesburg on the early morning of 23 January 2018 from prostate cancer, aged 78.

Awards and honours
Masekela was honoured with a Google Doodle on 4 April 2019, which would have been his 80th birthday. The Doodle depicts Masekela, dressed in colourful shirt, playing a flugelhorn in front of a banner.

Grammy history
Masekela was nominated for a Grammy Award three times, including a nomination for Best World Music Album for his 2012 album Jabulani, one for Best Musical Cast Show Album for Sarafina! The Music Of Liberation (1989) and one for Best Contemporary Pop Performance for the song "Grazing in the Grass" (1968).

Honours
Rhodes University: Doctor of Music (honoris causa), 2015
University of York: Honorary Doctorate in Music 2014
Order of Ikhamanga: 2010 South African National Orders Ceremony, 27 April 2010
Ghana Music Awards: 2007 African Music Legend award
2005 Channel O Music Video Awards: Lifetime Achievement Award
2002 BBC Radio Jazz Awards: International Award of the Year
Nominated for Broadway's 1988 Tony Award for Best Score (Musical), with music and lyrics collaborator Mbongeni Ngema, for Sarafina!
2016 MTV Africa Music Awards (MAMAs): Legend Award

Discography

Albums

Chart singles

Autobiography
 With D. Michael Cheers (2004). Still Grazing: The Musical Journey of Hugh Masekela, Crown,

References

External links

 Official website
 "Hugh Masekela – Legend of South African Music" a backstage interview with NYC Radio LIVE!, 2013
 "Hugh Masekela archive interview" - a video interview with Robin Denselow of The Guardian, 2011
 "A conversation with musician Hugh Masekela" – a video interview on Charlie Rose, 2009
 "Still Grazing - Hugh Masekela on coming home from exile" by Hugh Masekela and D. Michael Cheers, book extract at News24
 "Hugh Masekela - Musician and Activist" – interview with Zeinab Badawi for HardTalk at BBC News, 2015

 

1939 births
2018 deaths
Jazz cornetists
South African jazz trumpeters
South African expatriates in the United States
Alumni of the Guildhall School of Music and Drama
Heads Up International artists
Jive Records artists
Mercury Records artists
MGM Records artists
Uni Records artists
Verve Records artists
Anti-apartheid activists
South African autobiographers
South African jazz composers
People from Witbank
Recipients of the Order of Ikhamanga
Deaths from prostate cancer
Deaths from cancer in South Africa
The Jazz Epistles members
Burials at Westpark Cemetery
20th-century South African male singers
21st-century South African male singers
Blue Thumb Records artists